Yaichit Wang (born 12 December 1937) is a Burmese boxer. He competed in the men's featherweight event at the 1956 Summer Olympics.

References

External links
 

1937 births
Living people
Burmese male boxers
Olympic boxers of Myanmar
Boxers at the 1956 Summer Olympics
Place of birth missing (living people)
Featherweight boxers